The 1987 West Coast Athletic Conference men's basketball tournament (now West Coast Conference) was held from  to  with the semifinals and finals at the War Memorial Gymnasium at the University of San Francisco in San Francisco, California.  the first edition of the conference tournament and included all eight teams.

The first round quarterfinals were held on the home courts of the top four seeds, and two of the hosts were  In the semifinals on a neutral court in San Francisco, the lower seeds won both  both had losing conference records.

Fifth-seeded Santa Clara defeated #7  in the championship game 77–65 to gain the automatic bid to the 64-team  and were seeded fifteenth in the West regional. Regular season champion San Diego, upset by a point in the conference  received an at-large bid and were the ninth seed in the Midwest regional; both WCAC teams lost in the first round.

Bracket

* denotes host team

References

West Coast Conference men's basketball tournament
Tournament
West Coast Athletic Conference men's basketball tournament
West Coast Athletic Conference men's basketball tournament
West Coast Athletic Conference men's basketball tournament